Djabel Manishimwe (born 10 May 1998) is a Rwandan football midfielder who currently plays for APR. He was a squad member for the 2017 CECAFA Cup, the 2018 and 2020 African Nations Championships.

References 

1998 births
Living people
Rwandan footballers
Rwanda international footballers
Isonga F.C. players
Rayon Sports F.C. players
APR F.C. players
Association football midfielders
2018 African Nations Championship players
Rwanda A' international footballers
2020 African Nations Championship players